WZCL-LP (98.1 FM, Club Radio) is a radio station broadcasting an Adult Contemporary/News Talk format. Licensed to Cabo Rojo-Mayagüez, Puerto Rico, the station serves the western Puerto Rico area. The station is currently owned by Club Radio PR Community, Inc.

External links

ZCL-LP
Radio stations established in 2015
2015 establishments in Puerto Rico
ZCL-LP
Cabo Rojo, Puerto Rico
ZCL-LP